Wherstead is a village and a civil parish located in the county of Suffolk, England. It is in the Belstead Brook electoral division of Suffolk County Council.

It is an ancient settlement, and from its soil the plough has brought to light many evidences of occupation by Romans and by early Britons. In the Domesday Book of 1086 the place is described under the Old English names Querstede and Wervesteda. Toponymic surnames which originate from Wherstead include Quested and Quersted. The name of the village and parish is in today generally pronounced Wersted or Warsted by the residents, the "a" in the latter case having the sound of "a" in father. Wherstead Park Mansion is a notable historic house which has been converted to a wedding venue.

A short ride by train through Ipswich carries passengers to Bourne Bridge, which marks the boundary of Wherstead parish. Near the bridge, on the Wherstead side, stands the Ostrich Inn, as it stood at the time of the New England migration. At that time, oysters were abundant in the River Orwell, and some speculate that Ostrich was a corruption from 'Oyster Ridge' or 'Oyster Reach'.  However the pub name is more likely to derive from the crest of lawyer and Chief Justice, Sir Edward Coke, who acquired the surrounding estate in 1609, and the pub sign is similar to others across East Anglia.

References

Merrill, Samuel; A Merrill Memorial, reprint, p 48-49

External links

Villages in Suffolk
Babergh District
Civil parishes in Suffolk